Iselilja is a Norwegian feminine given name. In 2015, in Norway 17 people had the name as a first name and 15 people had it as a middle name, according to SSB's name statistics.

Origin 

The name is, according to Norwegian historian Harald S. Næss in his eponymous Knut Hamsun biography (1984) and according to A Handbook of Scandinavian Names (2010), a probable influence for the later name Iselin known since the mid 18th century.

References 

Norwegian feminine given names